Majdan Sieniawski is a village in the administrative district of Gmina Adamówka, within Przeworsk County, Subcarpathian Voivodeship, in south-eastern Poland.

The village has a population of 1,600.

History
The village was founded in the 17th century. Initially it was called Dobropole, however, it was soon renamed to Majdan Sieniawski after its founder, nobleman Mikołaj Sieniawski from the Sieniawski noble family. In 1835, August Czartoryski established an institute for poor elderly people in the village. In 1881, the village had a population of 2,442, overwhelmingly Catholic by confession.

Sports
The local football club is GKS Majdan Sieniawski. It competes in the lower leagues.

Notable people
Adam Gruca (1893–1983), renown Polish orthopaedist, inventor, and surgeon

References

Villages in Przeworsk County